Gabriel Alw (25 December 1889 – 9 November 1946) was a Swedish film actor. He appeared in more than 30 films between 1915 and 1946.

Selected filmography
 The Price of Betrayal (1915)
 Ingmar's Inheritance (1925)
 To the Orient (1926)
 Walpurgis Night (1935)
 June Nights (1940)
 If I Could Marry the Minister (1941)
 There's a Fire Burning (1943)
 I Killed (1943)
 Kristin Commands (1946)
 The Bells of the Old Town (1946)

References

External links

1889 births
1946 deaths
People from Eskilstuna
Swedish male film actors
Swedish male silent film actors
20th-century Swedish male actors